Robert Archer (fl. 1407–1411), of Winchester, Hampshire, was an English politician.

He was a Member (MP) of the Parliament of England for Winchester in 1407 and 1411.

References

14th-century births
15th-century deaths
Politicians from Winchester
English MPs 1407
English MPs 1411